Mojo! is a 2003 puzzle video game released for PlayStation 2 and Xbox. The player controls a marble through a series of traps in order to break all of the colored blocks in a level. It is somewhat similar to Super Monkey Ball, Marble Blast Gold, and Marble Madness, yet is much different and provides a much larger set of puzzles and obstacles to solve. Players receive a bonus if they beat a level in a certain amount of time. There are 100 levels included in the game, and a few multiplayer modes. There is also a stage editor where players can create all new levels. The PlayStation 2 version was issued on CD while the Xbox version was issued on DVD.

Reception

Mojo! received mixed reviews from critics. On Metacritic, the game holds a score of 63/100 for the PlayStation 2 version based on 7 reviews, indicating "mixed or average reviews". On GameRankings, the game holds scores of 65.46% for the PlayStation 2 version based on 12 reviews, and 65.50% for the Xbox version based on 4 reviews.

References 

2003 video games
Crave Entertainment games
FarSight Studios games
Marble games
PlayStation 2 games
Xbox games
Multiplayer and single-player video games
Video games developed in the United States